The 1930–31 Challenge Cup was the 31st staging of rugby league's oldest knockout competition, the Challenge Cup.

First round

Second round

Quarterfinals

Semifinals

Final
Halifax beat York 22-8 in the final at Wembley before a crowd of 40,368.

This was Halifax’s third Challenge Cup final win in four Cup final appearances.

To date this was the only Challenge Cup final appearance by York.

References

Challenge Cup
Challenge Cup